, commonly known as Takeoka, is a Japanese automobile manufacturer that specializes in microcars.

Company history
The company was founded in 1981 in Toyama. On October 1, 1982, the entry was made as a Yūgen gaisha. The production of small cars began in 1990. The brand name is Takeoka.

In 1998 the range was expanded to include electric cars.

Products
The first model Abbey (ア ビ ー, Abī) was 215 cm long and weighed about 145 kg. A 49 cc engine drove the vehicles. Up to 1997 about 1500 of them were sold. The current series, the Abbey Carrot, uses the water-cooled four-cylinder engine of the Yamaha CE50 scooter with a displacement of 50 cm³, weighs 160 kg and reaches .

The T-10 is also an electric car of 224 cm in length, 365 kg in weight,  top speed with a 45 km range. There is a T-10G version with a 50 cm² petrol engine for long-distance journeys.

In addition, the company launched the electric snow plow Oscha (オ ス チ ャ, Osucha) in 2013.

References

External links

 Official Website

Car manufacturers of Japan
Vehicle manufacturing companies established in 1982
Japanese companies established in 1982
Companies based in Toyama Prefecture